Errington is a small community on Vancouver Island, British Columbia, Canada, located on Errington Road, off Highway 4, just south of Parksville and Qualicum Beach.

The unincorporated rural community is part of the Regional District of Nanaimo's Electoral Area F. In 2016, this rural residential and farming community had a population of 2,677. There is a designated village centre with a post office, general store, community hall, cemetery and other businesses.

Established in 1922, the Errington War Memorial Hall and adjacent park host such annual events as the seasonal Errington Farmers' Market, Hi Neighbour Day, Pumpkin Trail, vaudeville show, and craft sales in addition to a regular community coffee houses and a professional concert series.

Duncan McMillan, an early resident is said to have named the community from the poem Jock of Hazeldean by Sir Walter Scott. The poem referred to the village of Errington in Northumberland England.

Englishman River Falls Provincial Park and Englishman River Regional Park are adjacent to the community.

References

External links
Regional District of Nanaimo, Electoral Area F
Towns in British Columbia
Travel in British Columbia
Official regional tourism website
 

Populated places in the Regional District of Nanaimo
Designated places in British Columbia